Hibiscus richardsonii is a plant in the Mallow family, Malvaceae. It is rare in New Zealand, but more commonly seen in eastern New South Wales in Australia. The species was named in honour of the plant collector and convict, John Richardson.

References

richardsonii
Malvales of Australia
Flora of New South Wales
Flora of New Zealand